This list of fictional birds is subsidiary to the list of fictional animals. Ducks, penguins and birds of prey are not included here, and are listed separately at list of fictional ducks, list of fictional penguins, and list of fictional birds of prey. For non-fictional birds see List of individual birds.

Struthioniformes (ostriches)

Casuariformes (cassowaries and emu)

Apterygiformes (kiwis)

Anseriformes (waterfowl)
See also List of fictional ducks and List of fictional ducks in animation

Galliformes (landfowl)

Phoenicopteriformes (flamingos)

Columbiformes (pigeons and doves)

Cuculiformes (cuckoos and roadrunners)

Caprimulgiformes (nightjars, hummingbirds, and swifts)

Nyctibiidae (potoos)

Gruiformes (cranes, rails, and allies)

Charadriiformes (gulls, terns, auks, and waders)

Gaviiformes (loons)

Sphenisciformes (penguins)
See List of fictional penguins

Procellariiformes (albatrosses, shearwaters, petrels, and storm-petrels)

Ciconiiformes (storks)

Pelecaniformes (pelicans, herons, ibises, and allies)

Cathartiformes (New World vultures)
See List of fictional birds of prey

Accipitriformes (hawks, eagles, and Old World vultures)
See List of fictional birds of prey

Strigiformes (owls)
See List of fictional birds of prey

Trogoniformes (trogons)

Bucerotiformes (hornbills and hoopoes)

Coraciiformes (kingfishers, rollers, and bee-eaters)

Piciformes (woodpeckers and toucans)

Falconiformes (falcons and caracaras)
See List of fictional birds of prey

Psittaciformes (parrots)

Passeriformes (perching birds)

Mythical bird characters

Unspecified birds
The eponymous protagonists from Angry Birds
Birdie the Early Bird from the McDonald's commercials
Buzby, a yellow bird of unspecified species in advertisements for British Telecom in the late 1970s/early 1980s
Harvey Beaks from the show of the same name.
Kazooie, the sidekick in the Banjo-Kazooie series
The Phillie Phanatic, the mascot of the Philadelphia Phillies
Pino, the Dutch counterpart of Big Bird in Sesamstraat
Wattoo Wattoo, an oval-shaped black and white bird in Wattoo Wattoo Super Bird
Woodstock, a bird of unknown species in the Charles M. Schulz's Peanuts comic strip.

Fictional bird species
Chocobo, a bird in the Final Fantasy series
Jayhawk, part "jay" and part "hawk" this bird is the mascot of the Kansas Jayhawks sports teams and has roots in Kansas lore
The Jubjub Bird from Lewis Carroll's poem "Jabberwocky"
Breegulls, of which Kazooie is one, from the Banjo-Kazooie series
Loftwings, flying mountable birds based on shoebills featured in The Legend of Zelda: Skyward Sword
Mockingjay, central bird that is part of the Hunger Games trilogy
Porgs, a species of penguin or puffin-like birds that live on Ach-To in Star Wars: The Last Jedi
The Roly-Poly Bird from Roald Dahl's children books The Enormous Crocodile and The Twits
The Snip Snip Bird in 64 Zoo Lane
Twitter Bird, the mascot of Twitter
Weatherbird, the mascot of the St. Louis Post-Dispatch; identified as a dicky-bird, a generic term for a small bird.

Humans transformed into birds
The six brothers turned into birds in German fairytale The Six Swans
The eleven siblings cursed by their queenly stepmother in The Wild Swans
Princess Odette, a human with a curse that turns her into a swan during the day in The Swan Princess
The Swan Maiden, a magical bird who turns into a beautiful woman in several folktales
Willy, a boy-turned-sparrow and main character in Willy the Sparrow

See also
List of avian humanoids
List of fictional birds of prey
List of fictional dinosaurs
List of fictional ducks
List of fictional penguins

References

 
Fictional